Mr. Quincey of Monte Carlo is a 1933 British comedy film directed by John Daumery and starring John Stuart, Rosemary Ames and Ben Welden. It was made at Teddington Studios as a quota quickie.

Cast
 John Stuart as Mr. Quincey  
 Rosemary Ames as Norma McLeod  
 Ben Welden as Grover Jones  
 George Merritt as Inspector

References

Bibliography
 Chibnall, Steve. Quota Quickies: The Birth of the British 'B' Film. British Film Institute, 2007.
 Low, Rachael. Filmmaking in 1930s Britain. George Allen & Unwin, 1985.
 Wood, Linda. British Films, 1927-1939. British Film Institute, 1986.

External links
 

1933 films
British comedy films
1933 comedy films
Films shot at Teddington Studios
Warner Bros. films
Quota quickies
Films directed by Jean Daumery
British black-and-white films
1930s English-language films
1930s British films